Calcium perchlorate is classified as a metal perchlorate salt with the molecular formula . It is an inorganic compound that is a yellow-white crystalline solid in appearance. As a strong oxidizing agent, it reacts with reducing agents when heated to generate heat and products that may be gaseous (which will cause pressurization in closed containers). Calcium perchlorate has been categorized as having explosive reactivity.  is a common chemical on the soil of planet Mars, counting for almost 1% of the Martian dust, by weight.

Properties 
Calcium perchlorate is a strong inorganic oxidizing agent, enhancing the combustion of other substances that can potentially lead to explosion. The perchlorate ion, has a highly symmetrical tetrahedral structure that is strongly stabilized in solution by its low electron-donating proton-accepting power and its relatively low polarizability.

Eutectic system 
Calcium perchlorate solution forms a simple eutectic system. The eutectic composition of the calcium perchlorate solution is 4.2 mol / 1000 g , very similar to the composition of closely related metal cation perchlorates of strontium and barium.<

Occurrences

Electrolyte conductance 
The interest in metal cation perchlorate interactions with photosensitive ligands has increased due to the development of highly specific fluorescence indicators.

Production 
Perchlorate salts are the product of a base and perchloric acid. Calcium perchlorate can be prepared through the heating of a mixture of calcium carbonate and ammonium perchlorate. Ammonium carbonate forms in the gaseous state, leaving behind a calcium perchlorate solid.

Reactions

Water 
Being very hygroscopic, calcium perchlorate is commonly seen in the presence of four water molecules, referred to as calcium perchlorate tetrahydrate .

Cyclic hydrogenphosphonates 
A hybrid organic-inorganic molecule is formed using dioxazaphosphocanes, eight-membered cyclic hydrogenphosphonates and calcium. Calcium from the calcium perchlorate contributes to the structural integrity of the oligomeric molecule; the four calcium ions are bridged between four dioxazaphosphocane moieties.

Human toxicity 
Calcium perchlorate is slightly toxic to humans, by ingestion or inhalation of dust particles, or (less so) by skin contact.

References 

 
 
 
 
 
 
 
 

Perchlorates
Calcium compounds